José García Barzanallana (February 24, 1819 - February 21, 1903) was a Spanish lawyer and politician.

Economy and finance ministers of Spain
1819 births
1903 deaths
Governors of the Bank of Spain